The Çevik Kuvvet ( or Rapid Response Force) is the riot squad of the General Directorate of Security (Turkish National Police). It was established in 1982, replacing the Toplum Polisi.

Equipment includes TOMA water cannon vehicles, Otokar Akrep "scorpion" APCs and the FN 303 less-lethal weapon.

References

External links

National law enforcement agencies of Turkey
1982 establishments in Turkey